The following is a list of films originally produced and/or distributed theatrically by Metro-Goldwyn-Mayer and released (or scheduled to be released) in the 2020s.

Released

Upcoming films

Undated films

See also 
 Lists of Metro-Goldwyn-Mayer films

Notes

References 

2020-2029
American films by studio
2020s in American cinema
Lists of 2020s films